George Lockhart of Tarbrax was a son of Sir Allan Lockhart of Cleghorn. He married Anne Lockhart of Tarbrax daughter of Sir James Lockhart of Lee. They lived at Tarbrax Castle and had a son William Lockhart of Tarbrax and a daughter Anne, who became Countess of Aberdeen.

From 1647 he was Commissary of Glasgow, according to the Lockhart papers in the National Archives of Scotland (NAS GD 33 & GD 118); or from May 1646 to October 1658.

Died October 1658.

References 
 Edinburgh Parliament commissioning of George Lockhart of Tarbrax The Records of the Parliaments of Scotland to 1707, K.M. Brown et al eds (St Andrews, 2007-2019), 1646/11/374. Date accessed: 7 August 2019.

Notes

Year of birth missing
1658 deaths
People from South Lanarkshire
Politics of Glasgow